Siiraku Nature Reserve is a nature reserve which is located in Pärnu County, Estonia.

The protected area was founded in 2007 to protect valuable habitat types and threatened species in Kalda and Lähkma village (both in former Surju Parish).

References

Nature reserves in Estonia
Geography of Pärnu County